The 2007 Ealing Southall by-election was a by-election for the House of Commons constituency of Ealing Southall, in west London. It was held on 19 July 2007.

The election was triggered when Piara Khabra, the Labour Party Member of Parliament for Ealing Southall, died on 19 June 2007.  Khabra had held the constituency since the 1992 election, while the Labour party has held the seat since its creation in the 1983 election, and the predecessor seat of Southall since it was created before the 1945 election.

The government moved the writ for the by-election in Parliament on 28 June 2007, the day after the funeral of Piara Khabra.  This by-election and the Sedgefield by-election, also being held on 19 July, were significant because they were the first elections to take place during the tenure of the new Prime Minister, Gordon Brown.

According to the Elections Office of Ealing Council, the electorate was 85,423 which represented an increase of 1,685 (2%) on the 2005 general election.

Candidates
Labour selected local councillor Virendra Sharma from a shortlist of two – with Jo Sidhu the other shortlisted candidate. As Khabra had previously announced his intention to stand down at the next UK general election, Labour had already decided on its selection rules and had chosen to have an all-women shortlist for the constituency at the next UK general election, but following Khabra's death, the Labour National Executive Committee decided the by-election selection would not be from an all-women shortlist. Following the selection, five Labour councillors defected to the Conservative Party.

The Liberal Democrats selected Nigel Bakhai as their candidate; he contested the constituency in 2005 and came second.  The party fared worse than expected nationally at the 2007 United Kingdom local elections, and several newspapers claimed the Ealing Southall by-election would be a major test of Menzies Campbell's leadership, with a poor result potentially leading to a leadership challenge. The Independent also claimed the party regarded the Ealing Southall election as winnable, and were focussing resources on the seat, in preference to the Sedgefield by-election, to be held the same day.

The Conservative Party selected Surinderpal Singh Lit – commonly known as Tony Lit – as its candidate.  He is the former Managing Director of Sunrise Radio and son of Avtar Lit who contested the constituency as an Independent candidate in the 2001 election and came third. The deputy chair of the local Conservatives, Brij Mohan Gupta, resigned from the party in protest at Lit's selection and endorsed Quentin Davies' criticisms of David Cameron's policies, joining instead the Liberal Democrats. Newspapers reported that Tony Lit attended a Labour Party  fundraising event and Sunrise donated £4,800 to Labour in June 2007, before he switched allegiance to the Conservatives  later that month. On the ballot paper, Lit was described as "David Cameron's Conservative" while the Sedgefield candidate was simply "Conservative".

Several other candidates stood.  The Respect party selected local teacher Salvinder Dhillon as its candidate; he previously contested the seat as an independent in 2001.
The UK Independence Party announced Indian-born Dr K. T. Rajan as its candidate.  He had previously stood for the party in various Welsh Assembly seats.  The Green Party selected their 2005 candidate, Sarah Edwards.

John Cartwright ran for the Official Monster Raving Loony Party, having stood repeatedly in Croydon Central and also at the 2006 Bromley and Chislehurst by-election.  The English Democrats chose Sati Chagger as their candidate.  Meanwhile, Yaqub Masih, General Secretary of UK Asian Christian Fellowship and a presenter on Sunrise Radio is stood for the Christian Party.  Local GP Gulbash Singh, Director of the Sikh Human Rights Group Jasdev Singh Rai and Kuldeep Singh Grewal all stood as independents.

The BBC report that independent candidates Kuldeep Singh Grewal urged his supporters to vote Labour, while Golbash Singh called on his supporters to vote Conservative, on 19 July. Due to electoral law the two men are not permitted to remove themselves from the ballot paper and still attracted votes.

Controversy
On 18 July 2007, the Metropolitan Police launched an investigation after receiving a complaint in writing from Labour's election agent Ken Clarke.  It related to a The Daily Telegraph website blog entry, posted on 17 July, which claimed to show the results of the postal voting ahead of the ballot.  The article on the Daily Telegraph website quoted "a source inside the Tory campaign". In response, a spokesman for the Conservative Party said: "Our agent in Ealing Southall hasn't published any such information or spoken to the Daily Telegraph."

The Telegraph Media Group said the blog entry was removed as soon as they were told it could breach electoral law.  The Metropolitan Police said the complaint would be "thoroughly investigated" and "appropriate action taken".

The Director of Public Prosecutions has also been asked by Labour to probe claims that the Liberal Democrats misrepresented Labour candidate Virendra Sharma in their election leaflets by listing his age as 72, when at the time of the election he was 60.

Results

General Election 2005 result

References

External links
Ealing Council website; – latest By-Election news
BBC News
Labour Party's Ealing Southall website
Ealing Liberal Democrats
Ealing Southall Conservatives
Ealing loony candidate 
By-elections blog
Ealing UK Independence Party 
Election leaflets from the by-election campaign

Ealing Southall by-election
Ealing Southall by-election
21st century in the London Borough of Ealing
By-elections to the Parliament of the United Kingdom in London constituencies
Elections in the London Borough of Ealing
Ealing Southall by-election